Gwen McCrae ( Mosley, December 21, 1943) is an American singer, best known for her 1975 hit "Rockin' Chair".

Life and career

1960s–1970s 
Gwen was the youngest of five children, She began performing in local clubs as a teenager, and singing with local groups like the Lafayettes and the Independents. In 1963, she met a young sailor named George McCrae, whom she married within a week.

From 1963, she recorded as a duo with her husband George; the couple got a recording contract with Henry Stone's TK Records. In 1967, singer Betty Wright, who helped get them signed to Stone's Alston record label.

Signed to TK subsidiary Cat, as a solo artist, she found success on the U.S. R&B charts with a cover of Bobby Bland's "Lead Me On" in 1970, followed by "For Your Love". Following husband George's |solo success with "Rock Your Baby", Gwen went on to have a major hit of her own in March 1975 with "Rockin' Chair" which reached number 9 on the Billboard Hot 100 and reached number one on the R&B chart. The follow-up "Love Insurance" also made the R&B chart (#16). Music critic Robert Christgau said "Rockin' Chair" is "almost as irresistibly Memphis-cum-disco-with-a-hook as hubby's 'Rock Your Baby.'"

In 1972, she recorded the song "Always on My Mind". The song was later popularized by Elvis Presley, Willie Nelson, and the Pet Shop Boys and also covered by several other artists.

1980s–1990s
After TK Records collapsed, McCrae moved to New Jersey and signed with Atlantic Records, recording two albums and saw one of her singles, "Funky Sensation", reach #22 on the R&B chart in 1981. In 1982, she had a moderate R&B hit with "Keep the Fire Burning". She continued to record and some of her earlier recordings on the UK's Northern Soul scene maintained her popularity as a live act in Europe. McCrae moved back to the United States, to Florida, recorded a one-off single for the small Black Jack label in 1984 called "Do You Know What I Mean", and then temporarily retired from the music industry.

McCrae traveled to the UK to record a couple of singles for Rhythm King Records  in 1987. She also recorded an album for a British label called Homegrown Records in 1996, titled Girlfriend's Boyfriend. Upon returning to the U.S., she signed with the revived Goldwax label, distributed by Ichiban Records, and recorded another album, Psychic Hot Line.

In 1999, the French house music duo Cassius released the single "Feeling for You", which sampled the vocals of McCrae's "All This Love That I'm Giving". It was a Top 20 hit on the UK Singles Chart. The track also appeared on Cassius' album, 1999. In 1999, her single "Funky Sensation" was sampled in the German single "Get Up," by DJ Thomilla featuring Afrob.

2000s and beyond
In 2004, McCrae released her first gospel album. In 2008, rap DJ and producer Madlib released his album, WLIB AM: King of the Wigflip which includes the song "Gamble on Ya Boy", based on a "I Found Love" sample, from McCrae's album, Melody of Life.

In 2005, McCrae teamed up with the Soulpower organization, which is also responsible for the comebacks of Marva Whitney, Lyn Collins, Martha High, Bobby Byrd and RAMP. Her collaboration with Soulpower resulted in various live performances with the Soulpower All-Stars.

In 2007, she appeared on several songs on Sounding Rick’s “Living in the Acoustic Projects” and again on his 2009 album “Blabbermouth”.

Gwen McCrae released her latest single "Now I Found Love" in December 2010, released through Plain Truth Entertainment. "Now I Found Love" was mixed and produced by Steve Sola and composed by David Seagal.

In June 2012, after performing on stage in England, she had a stroke  which resulted in paralysis on the left side of her body and the inability to walk.

Discography

Albums

Singles

See also
List of soul musicians
List of disco artists (F–K)
List of acts who appeared on American Bandstand
List of artists who reached number one on the Billboard R&B chart
List of 1970s one-hit wonders in the United States

References

External links
 
 Gwen McCrae video interview

1943 births
Living people
20th-century African-American women singers
American dance musicians
American soul singers
Atlantic Records artists
Columbia Records artists
Musicians from Pensacola, Florida
Singers from Florida
20th-century American singers
21st-century American singers
20th-century American women singers
American disco singers
American rhythm and blues singers
21st-century American women singers
21st-century African-American women singers